The 2016 CONCACAF Women's Olympic Qualifying Championship qualification was a women's football competition which decided the participating teams of the 2016 CONCACAF Women's Olympic Qualifying Championship.

A total of eight teams qualified to play in the final tournament, where the berths were allocated to the three regional zones as follows:
Three teams from the North American Zone (NAFU), i.e., Canada, Mexico and the hosts United States, who all qualified automatically
Two teams from the Central American Zone (UNCAF)
Three teams from the Caribbean Zone (CFU)

The top two teams of the final tournament qualified for the 2016 Summer Olympics women's football tournament in Brazil.

Teams
A total of 23 CONCACAF member national teams entered the tournament. Among them, three teams qualified automatically for the final tournament, and 20 teams entered the regional qualifying competitions.

Notes
1 Non-IOC member, ineligible for Olympics.

Central American Zone

In the Central American Zone, five UNCAF member national teams entered the qualifying competition. They were placed in a single group, as confirmed on 28 February 2015 at the UNCAF Executive Committee meeting in Managua, Nicaragua. The matches were played between 30 September and 4 October 2015 in Nicaragua (originally between 26 September and 4 October 2015 before Honduras withdrew). The top two teams qualified for the final tournament as the UNCAF representatives.

Times UTC−6.

Group

Goalscorers
3 goals

 Melissa Herrera
 Karla Villalobos

2 goals

 Katherine Alvarado
 Carolina Venegas
 Coralia Monterroso
 Marilyn Rivera

1 goal

 Francisca González
 Vivian Herrera
 Ana Cate

Caribbean Zone

In the Caribbean Zone, 15 CFU member national teams entered the qualifying competition. All 15 teams entered the first round, where they were divided into three groups of four teams and one group of three teams. The groups were played between 21–25 August and 13–15 October 2015 and hosted by one of the teams in each group. The four group winners advanced to the final round.

In the final round, played between 18–20 October 2015 and hosted by one of the teams in the final round, the four teams played a single-elimination tournament. The top three teams qualified for the final tournament as the CFU representatives.

Times UTC−4.

First round

Group 1
Matches played in Puerto Rico.

Group 2
Matches played in Trinidad and Tobago (changed from original hosts Saint Lucia, scheduled for 21–25 August at Mindoo Phillip Park, Castries, but postponed due to Tropical Storm Erika). After two of the four teams withdrew, the format was changed to a two-legged tie between the two remaining teams in the lead-up to the final round.

Group 3
Matches played in Dominican Republic (changed from original hosts Suriname).

Group 4
Matches played in Dominican Republic (changed from original hosts Saint Kitts and Nevis).

Final round
Matches played in Trinidad and Tobago (originally scheduled for 2–4 October 2015, but delayed due to the postponement of first round Group 2).

Semi-finals
Winners qualified for 2016 CONCACAF Women's Olympic Qualifying Championship.

Third place playoff
Winner qualified for 2016 CONCACAF Women's Olympic Qualifying Championship.

Final

Goalscorers
12 goals
 Nérilia Mondésir

11 goals
 Karina Socarrás

8 goals
 Batcheba Louis

6 goals
 Ahkeela Mollon

5 goals

 Venicia Reid
 Marjorie Martínez
 Tasha St. Louis

4 goals

 Betzaida Ubri
 Tashana Vincent

3 goals

 Otesha Charles
 Sherly Jeudy
 Khadija Shaw
 Annie Méndez
 Selimar Pagán

2 goals

 Yaqueisi Núñez
 Winibian Peralta
 Paloma Pérez
 Mariam El-Masri
 Roselord Borgella
 Ashley Rivera
 Lauryn Hutchinson

1 goal

 Maria Pérez
 Roneisha Frank
 Grace John
 Calaigh Copland
 Kayla De Souza
 Olivia Gonsalves
 Alison Heydorn
 Brittany Persaud
 Ashley Rodrigues
 Soveline Beaubrun
 Yvrase Gerville
 Woodlyne Robuste
 Chinyelu Asher
 Christine Exeter
 Shanise Foster
 Donna-Kay Henry
 Kai-Lin Hernandez
 Jodi-Ann McGregor
 Monique Pryce
 Ellaisa Marquis
 Nicole Rodríguez
 Sharain Cummings
 Karyn Forbes
 Naomie Guerra
 Dernelle Mascall

Own goal

 Jenneling Lacle (playing against Puerto Rico)
 Tabique Lockhard (playing against Jamaica)
 Donisha Xavier (playing against Dominincan Republic)
 Nicole Rodríguez (playing against Haiti)

Note: Six goals scored by Cuba and one goal scored by Jamaica missing goalscorer information.

Qualified teams
The following eight teams qualified for the final tournament.

1 Bold indicates champion for that year. Italic indicates host for that year.

References

External links
Olympic Qualifying – Women, CONCACAF.com
Fútbol Femenino Proceso Olímpico, UNCAFut.com 

Qualification
Olympic Qualifying Championship, Women's qualification
Concacaf Women's Olympic Qualifying Championship qualification